Daniel Nedyalkov Genov (born 12 May 1989) is a Bulgarian professional footballer who currently plays as a winger for Botev Vratsa.

Career
Genov played youth football with CSKA Sofia, Septemvri Sofia and Slavia Sofia.

In January 2009, Genov joined Kom-Minyor. He made his debut on 14 March in a match against Rilski Sportist as a 48th-minute substitute.

Inter Baku
In July 2010, Genov signed a two-and-a-half-year contract with Azerbaijani side Inter Baku. He made his debut in a 2–0 home loss against Neftchi on 28 August. In his first season, Genov earned only 7 appearances in the Azerbaijan Premier League.

In June 2011, Simurq signed Genov on a season-long loan deal. On 25 March 2012, he opened the scoring in a 2–1 away win over Sumgayit.

Genov was released by Inter in December 2013.

Lokomotiv Sofia
On 31 January 2014, Genov signed one-and-a-half-year contract with Lokomotiv Sofia. On 22 February, he made his debut, replacing Petar Dimitrov for the last 35 minutes of a 5–0 home win over Neftochimic Burgas. Genov scored his first Lokomotiv goal on 13 April in a 2–0 away win to Lyubimets 2007.

On 7 January 2015, Genov signed a one-year contract extension, keeping him at Lokomotiv until 30 June 2016.

Lokomotiv Sofia finished season 2014-15 on 3rd place but was related to amateur football league due to financial difficulties. The contract of Daniel Genov, who scored 8 goals in 31 games in A Grupa that season, as well as the contracts of all other players were terminated.

Botev Plovdiv
On 29 June Daniel Genov and Valentin Galev, his ex-teammate from Lokomotiv Sofia, joined Botev Plovdiv on free transfer.

On 18 July Genov made an exciting official debut for Botev Plovdiv in the match against Levski Sofia when he came on as a substitute and scored the equalizer in a 1-1 draw.

On 23 September Daniel Genov scored during the 0-4 away win over FC Septemvri Simitli in a game for the Bulgarian Cup.

At the end of 2015 Nikolay Kostov, the new manager of Botev Plovdiv, decided to release Daniel Genov on a free transfer. On 14 January 2016 the contract of Genov was terminated on a mutual agreement. Genov played in 22 games for Botev Plovdiv and scored 2 goals.

Pirin Blagoevgrad
On 14 January 2016 Daniel terminated his contract with Botev Plovdiv by mutual agreement and signed with Pirin Blagoevgrad.

Botev Vratsa
In June 2022 Genov joined Botev Vratsa for a second spell with the club.

Career statistics

References

External links
 Profile at Sportal.bg
 

1989 births
Living people
Bulgarian footballers
Shamakhi FK players
Simurq PIK players
FC Lokomotiv 1929 Sofia players
Botev Plovdiv players
OFC Pirin Blagoevgrad players
FC Montana players
Enosis Neon Paralimni FC players
FC Botev Vratsa players
PFC Beroe Stara Zagora players
First Professional Football League (Bulgaria) players
Cypriot Second Division players
Expatriate footballers in Azerbaijan
Expatriate footballers in Cyprus
Association football midfielders
Bulgarian expatriate sportspeople in Azerbaijan